The PR3 women's coxless pair competition at the 2018 World Rowing Championships in Plovdiv took place at the Plovdiv Regatta Venue.

Schedule
The schedule was as follows:

All times are Eastern European Summer Time (UTC+3)

Results
With fewer than seven entries in this event, a direct final was held to determine the rankings.

References

2018 World Rowing Championships
World